Pulaski High School is a public high school in Pulaski, Wisconsin, United States, in Brown County (school district also serves parts of Shawano, Outagamie and Oconto counties), that serves students in grades 9 through 12.  Its mascot is the Red Raider.

History
The original school was built in 1909, with additions throughout the next five decades. In 1975, the high school took over an existing school along with other additions, most notably an indoor swimming pool. Another new building was built in 1998 due to a rapidly growing population.

Academics
Pulaski offers Advanced Placement classes. The student to teacher ratio is 18 to 1.

Demographics
Over 90 percent of the student body is Caucasian, while 2.9 percent are American Indian, 2.5 percent are Hispanic, 1.4 percent are African American and 1.0 percent are Asian. The school is split 51/49 male to female, while just over 22 percent of the school is eligible for free or reduced lunch.

Athletics

State Championships
 Boys' Basketball: 2013
 Wrestling: 1969, 1974, 1993 (all runner-up)
 Football: 1980 (runner-up)
 Softball: 1996 (runner-up)
 Cross Country: 2004 (runner-up)
 Rugby: 2009, 2010, 2014, 2015, 2018
Pulaski has also had a number of individual state champions.

In 2016, Pulaski citizens privately funded a $4.9 million athletic expansion project, including a new football stadium, track, baseball and softball fields, as well as expanding the tennis facilities.

Incident involving Mike McCarthy
On February 27, 2019, the school became the center of attention during a basketball game against Notre Dame Academy after former Green Bay Packers head coach Mike McCarthy was berating officials during the game. A complaint was submitted to the Wisconsin Interscholastic Athletic Association following the incident. McCarthy's behavior was criticized as "unacceptable" from the Notre Dame Academy and Pulaski athletic director Janet Batten. A day later, McCarthy apologized for the incident.

Music
The Red Raider Marching Band performed in the 2007, 2012, and 2017 Rose Parades and in the 2003 Macy's Thanksgiving Day Parade in New York City.

Notable alumni
 Jacqui Banaszynski, Pulitzer Prize-winning writer
 Jeremy Borseth, NFL punter
 Carey Lohrenz, F-14 Tomcat pilot

References

External links
Pulaski High School website

Public high schools in Wisconsin
Schools in Brown County, Wisconsin